Gitapuram is a neighbourhood in the Srirangam zone of the city of Tiruchirappalli. It is located within Srirangam Island.

References 

 

Neighbourhoods and suburbs of Tiruchirappalli